Muhammad Azam bin Azmi Murad (born 12 February 2001) is a Malaysian professional footballer who plays as a right-back for Malaysia Super League club Terengganu and the Malaysia national team.

Career statistics

Club

International

Honours
Terengganu
 Malaysia FA Cup runner-up: 2022
 Malaysia Super League runner-up: 2022

References

External links
 

2001 births
Living people
People from Penang
Malaysian footballers
Malaysia youth international footballers
Terengganu F.C. II players
Terengganu FC players
Malaysia Super League players
Malaysian people of Malay descent
Association football defenders
Competitors at the 2021 Southeast Asian Games
Southeast Asian Games competitors for Malaysia